The historic Hubbard County Courthouse is a prominent Neoclassical public building in Park Rapids, Minnesota, United States. It served as the seat of government for Hubbard County from 1900 until the 1970s.  It now houses the Hubbard County Historical Museum and Nemeth Art Center.

See also
List of county courthouses in Minnesota
National Register of Historic Places listings in Hubbard County, Minnesota

References

County courthouses in Minnesota
Courthouses on the National Register of Historic Places in Minnesota
Government buildings completed in 1900
National Register of Historic Places in Hubbard County, Minnesota
Neoclassical architecture in Minnesota